Sean M. Ryan is an American attorney and politician serving as a member of the New York State Senate from the 61st District. A Democrat, he previously served as a member of the New York State Assembly from 2011 to 2021, and the 60th District from 2021-2022.

Education

Ryan earned a Bachelor of Arts degree from the State University of New York at Fredonia and a Juris Doctor from Brooklyn Law School. He was then admitted the New York State Bar Association.

Career
As an attorney, Ryan has specialized in anti-discrimination and labor law cases. On September 13, 2011, Ryan was elected during a special election to the New York State Assembly, succeeding longtime assemblyman Sam Hoyt.

In 2012, he was elected to the 149th district. He was supported by the 1199SEIU United Healthcare Workers East.

In 2020, he was elected to New York's 60th senate district. Following the modification of the New York districts in 2022, he ran for and was elected to the newly drawn 61st senate district.

Electoral history

References

External links
New York State Senate member website
Campaign website

|-

Brooklyn Law School alumni
Living people
Democratic Party members of the New York State Assembly
People from Erie County, New York
State University of New York at Fredonia alumni
21st-century American politicians
1965 births